{{DISPLAYTITLE:C16H12FN3O3}}
The molecular formula C16H12FN3O3 (molar mass: 313.283 g/mol, exact mass: 313.0863 u) may refer to:

 Flubendazole
 Flunitrazepam

Molecular formulas